Dialium holtzii is a species of plant in the family Fabaceae. It is found in Kenya, Mozambique, and Tanzania.

References

holtzii
Flora of Kenya
Flora of Mozambique
Flora of Tanzania
Vulnerable plants
Taxonomy articles created by Polbot